Jonathan Lee Klinsmann (born April 8, 1997) is an American professional soccer player who plays as a goalkeeper for Major League Soccer club LA Galaxy. He is the son of German former footballer Jürgen Klinsmann. He holds both German and American citizenship.

Early life
Jonathan Klinsmann was born in Munich, Germany, on April 8, 1997. His father is former German footballer and manager Jürgen Klinsmann, and his mother is former American model Debbie Chin, who was born in San Jose, California to Chinese immigrants. From 1998 to 2008, Jonathan lived with his parents in Newport Beach, California. He then moved back to Munich in 2008 until the end of 2009, while his father was manager of Bayern Munich. Klinsmann graduated in 2015 from Mater Dei High School in Santa Ana, California, and from 2015 to 2017 attended the University of California, Berkeley. He has both American and German citizenship. In addition to soccer, Klinsmann also played basketball in his time at the Mater Dei High School.

Youth soccer
Jonathan spent most of his youth playing as a striker at FC Blades 96 and the Irvine Lasers. Only with his move to the Bayern Munich youth academy did he transition to goalkeeper. Upon his return to California, he became part of the U.S. Soccer Development Academy, and henceforth played for Pateadores FC and then at Irvine Strikers FC. In parallel, he played from 2011 to 2014 for his high school team MDHS Varsity Soccer. In the 2014 season, he completed 33 games for the Strikers in the Development Academy and reached the finals of the National Championship. From 2015 to 2017, Klinsmann played for the California Golden Bears, where he made 22 appearances.

Club career

Hertha BSC
After having spent most of his school holidays between 2014 and 2017 with the youth teams of his father's home club VfB Stuttgart, Klinsmann completed part of his preparation for the 2017 FIFA U-20 World Cup at VfB Stuttgart II, West Ham United, and Everton. After initial interest from Eintracht Braunschweig, Klinsmann completed a ten-day trial from July 3, 2017 with Hertha BSC. Even before the ten-day trial was over, Klinsmann signed professionally on July 11, with the contract lasting until June 30, 2019.

Klinsmann made his professional debut for Hertha BSC in the UEFA Europa League on December 7, 2017, in which he saved a penalty in a 1–1 home draw against Östersunds FK.

Los Angeles Galaxy
On 20 August 2020, Klinsmann signed a three-year contract with LA Galaxy of Major League Soccer (MLS).

International career
Klinsmann has been active for the youth teams of the United States since 2014. From 2014 to 2015, he was a member of the under-18 team. In 2017, Klinsmann was included in the squad for the under-20 national team at the 2017 CONCACAF U-20 Championship. He played in all but one of the six tournament matches. The United States were crowned under-20 champions of CONCACAF following a 5–3 win on penalties in the final against Honduras. Klinsmann was awarded the golden glove as the best goalkeeper of the tournament, and included in the team of the tournament. In addition, the United States qualified for the 2017 FIFA U-20 World Cup in South Korea, where Klinsmann started in all five matches. The United States were eliminated from the tournament following a 1–2 defeat after extra time in the quarter-finals against eventual losing finalists Venezuela.

On November 12, 2018, Klinsmann was called up for the first time to the United States men's national soccer team for friendlies against England and Italy as an injury replacement for Zack Steffen.

Career statistics

Club

Honors
United States U20
CONCACAF Under-20 Championship: 2017

Individual
CONCACAF Under-20 Championship Golden Glove: 2017
CONCACAF Under-20 Championship Best XI: 2017

References

External links
 

1997 births
Living people
Footballers from Munich
Citizens of the United States through descent
American soccer players
American sportspeople of Chinese descent
American people of German descent
German people of American descent
Sportspeople of American descent
German people of Chinese descent
American expatriate soccer players in Germany
United States men's youth international soccer players
United States men's under-20 international soccer players
Association football goalkeepers
California Golden Bears men's soccer players
Hertha BSC II players
Hertha BSC players
Regionalliga players
United States men's under-23 international soccer players
LA Galaxy players
Major League Soccer players
LA Galaxy II players
USL Championship players
American expatriate soccer players